Apodemus is a genus of Muridae (true mice and rats).  The name is unrelated to that of the Mus genus, instead being derived from the Greek ἀπό-δημος (literally away from home).

Taxonomy 
Related to the Ryūkyū spiny rats (Tokudaia) and the prehistoric Rhagamys – and far more distantly to Mus and Malacomys – it includes these species:

Apodemus sensu stricto 
 Striped field mouse, A. agrarius
 Small Japanese field mouse, A. argenteus
 Chevrier's field mouse, A. chevrieri

Alsomys 
 South China field mouse, A. draco
 Himalayan field mouse, A. gurkha
 Sichuan field mouse, A. latronum
 Korean field mouse, A. peninsulae
 Taiwan field mouse, A. semotus
 Large Japanese field mouse, A. speciosus

Sylvaemus 
 Alpine field mouse, A. alpicola
 Yellow-necked mouse, A. flavicollis – includes A. arianus
 Caucasus field mouse, A. hyrcanicus
 Ward's field mouse, A. pallipes
 Black Sea field mouse, A. ponticus
 Wood mouse, A. sylvaticus 
 Ural field mouse, A. uralensis
 Pygmy field mouse, A. u. microps
 Cimrman Ural field mouse, A. u. cimrmani
 Steppe field mouse, A.  witherbyi

Karstomys 
 Western broad-toothed field mouse, A. epimelas
 Eastern broad-toothed field mouse, A. mystacinus
 Kashmir field mouse, A. rusiges

Incertae sedis 

Apodemus avicennicus Darvish, Javidkar & Siahsarvie, 2006

Prehistoric species described from fossil remains include:
 A. gorafensis (Late Miocene/Early Pliocene of Italy)
 A.  dominans (Kolzoi 1959)

References

Further reading
 
 Steppan, S.J.; Adkins, R.M.; Spinks, P.Q. & Hale, C. (2005): Multigene phylogeny of the Old World mice, Murinae, reveals distinct geographic lineages and the declining utility of mitochondrial genes compared to nuclear genes.  Mol. Phylogenet. Evol. 37(2): 370–388.  PDF fulltext
Darvish, J.; Javidkar, M.; Siahsarvie, R. 2006. A new species of wood mouse of the genus Apodemus (Rodentia, Muridae) from Iran Zoology in the Middle East

 
Rodent genera
Taxa named by Johann Jakob Kaup
Extant Miocene first appearances